Edward Gnat (1 March 1940 – 6 January 2021) was a Polish politician.

Biography
He served as a Member of the Sejm from 1985–1989 and from 1993–1997. Gnat was born in Maurzyce, and died in Łódź, aged 80, of COVID-19 during the COVID-19 pandemic in Poland.

References

1940 births
2021 deaths
People from Łowicz County
20th-century Polish farmers
Polish People's Party politicians
Recipients of the Order of Polonia Restituta
Members of the Polish Sejm 1993–1997
Members of the Polish Sejm 1985–1989
Deaths from the COVID-19 pandemic in Poland
21st-century farmers